The Gross Cutoff (sometimes referred to as the Gross-Callahan Cutoff) was a rail line built by the Seaboard Air Line Railroad in northern Florida.  It ran from the Seaboard Air Line Railroad’s main line at a point known as Gross to Callahan connecting two pre-existing tracks.

Route and history
Gross was the name of a small turpentine village along the Seaboard Air Line main line about 7 miles north of Yulee (near the current interchange between Interstate 95 and US 17).  From Gross, the line proceeded from the Seaboard main line southwest though a forest where it crossed Mills Creek to Callahan where it connected with the Seaboard's line from Fernandina and Yulee to Baldwin (the former Florida Railroad).  The Gross Cutoff was built in 1925 and acted as a bypass for the busy Jacksonville Terminal area, which trains would have to otherwise pass through.  Trains could then continue from Callahan to the Seaboard main line in Baldwin.

The line was busy enough by 1948 that the Seaboard Air Line installed Centralized traffic control along the line with three passing sidings.  Its heavy use also cause the Seaboard Air Line to abandon the old Florida Railroad from its connection with the Gross Cutoff in Callahan to Yulee in 1954.

In 1967, the Seaboard Air Line merged with its rival, the Atlantic Coast Line Railroad, the main line of which crossed the former Florida Railroad in Callahan.  The merged company was named the Seaboard Coast Line Railroad.  The line was designated as the Gross Subdivision in the Seaboard Coast Line era.  In the merged network, the former Atlantic Coast Line Railroad main line was prioritized for through train traffic to and from the north, reducing the importance of the Gross Subdivision.  The line was abandoned in 1985, right around the same time the former Seaboard Air Line main line was abandoned in southwestern Georgia, cutting it off as a through route.

Historic stations
Baldwin to Gross

References

Defunct Florida railroads
Railroad cutoffs
Seaboard Air Line Railroad
Transportation in Nassau County, Florida